Anumantharayan Kottai is a village in Dindigul District in the Indian state of Tamil Nadu. It is on the Dindigul–Kodaikanal Highway,  from Dindigul. The nearest railway station is Dindigul, and the nearest airport is Madurai.

Church 
The world's first church built for St. Ignatius is in Anumantharayan Kottai (அனுமந்தராயன்கோட்டை). It was blessed on 31 July 1822.

Education 
 Infant Jesus Nursery School 
 Sacred Heart Boy's Primary School
 RC Sirumalar Girls Primary School
 Loyola Higher Secondary School.
 CRAYON ( child relief and research Institute) alternative learning centers.

Hospitals 
 Govt. Primary Health Centre
 St. Mary of Leuca Hospital

Government offices 
 Village Panchayat Office 
 Village Administrative Office.

Petrol bunk 
Bharat Petroleum Petrol bunk is in the village.

Services  
 Canara Bank
 Post Office

References 

Villages in Dindigul district